The Evansville and Crawfordsville Railroad Company was Evansville, Indiana's first railroad company. It was first chartered in 1853 by William D. Griswold, a lawyer in Terre Haute, Indiana. It was renamed Evansville and Terre Haute Railroad in 1877. It went on to be consolidated without railroads of the region into the Chicago & Eastern Illinois Railroad. Chauncey Rose was a key player in financing its construction.

The Vincennes railroad was originally chartered as the Evansville & Illinois to connect with the Ohio & Mississippi Railroad at Olney, later at Vincennes January 21, 1849.  It was extended to Terre Haute, Rockville, and Crawfordsville. The section from Vincennes to Terre Haute, 58 miles built under WD Griswold and Chauncey Rose, was opened to through traffic on November 23, 1853 and completed in 1854. Rose donated his stock in the Terre Haute & Indianapolis Railroad to the Evansville and Crawfordsville to finance its construction.

References

External links

History 

Defunct Indiana railroads
Transportation in Evansville, Indiana
Predecessors of the Chicago and Eastern Illinois Railroad
Railway companies established in 1853
Railway companies disestablished in 1877
1853 establishments in Indiana